Jordan Torunarigha (born 7 August 1997) is a German professional footballer who plays as a defender for First Division A club Gent. He is the son of former footballer Ojokojo Torunarigha and the brother of current footballer Junior Torunarigha.

Club career

Early career 
Born in Chemnitz, Torunarigha joined Hertha BSC as a child in 2006 and signed his first professional contract on 19 December 2016. He played as a striker before Hertha's U-15 coach Ante Čović had the idea to make him switch into a defender.

Hertha Berlin 
He made his debut for the first team on 4 February 2017, coming on as a 90th-minute substitute in a 1–0 win over FC Ingolstadt. He made his first start for the Hertha on 5 April 2017 against Borussia Mönchengladbach, starting at left back following illness to Marvin Plattenhardt and suspension for Maximilian Mittelstädt. He scored his first goal for the club in a 2–0 win over Darmstadt 98 on 13 May 2017, sending Hertha up to 5th in the table with one match remaining.

Loan to Gent 
On 28 January 2022, Torunarigha joined Gent in the Belgian First Division A on loan.

Gent 
On 19 July 2022, Torunarigha joined Gent on a permanent basis, signing a three year deal.

International career
In May 2018, after representing Germany at youth international level, he turned down the opportunity to represent Nigeria.

Personal life
Jordan is of Nigerian descent.

References

External links

Living people
1997 births
Sportspeople from Chemnitz
Footballers from Saxony
Association football defenders
German footballers
Germany youth international footballers
Germany under-21 international footballers
Olympic footballers of Germany
German sportspeople of Nigerian descent
Hertha BSC II players
Hertha BSC players
K.A.A. Gent players
Bundesliga players
Regionalliga players
Belgian Pro League players
Footballers at the 2020 Summer Olympics
German expatriate footballers
Expatriate footballers in Belgium
German expatriate sportspeople in Belgium